Antonio Santos may refer to:
António Machado Santos (1875–1921), Portuguese navy officer
Antonio Santos Peralba (1885–?), Spanish football administrator
António de Almeida Santos (1926–2016), Portuguese politician
Antônio Carlos Santos (born 1964), Brazilian footballer
Antonio Santos (baseball) (born 1996), Dominican baseball player
Antonio Santos Sánchez (born 1998), Mexican footballer
Antonio Sánchez Santos, Spanish football coach for the 1997–98 Real Valladolid season

See also
Antonio dos Santos (disambiguation)
Antonio Santosuosso
Santo António (disambiguation)